"Creep" is a song by American rock band Stone Temple Pilots, appearing as the seventh track off the band's debut album, Core and later released as a single. The song also appears on the band's greatest hits album, Thank You. A live version featuring Aaron Lewis is included on The Family Values 2001 Tour release.

Composition

In a November 2014 interview with Songfacts, Scott Weiland said, "That's just the idea of being a young person somewhere, caught between still being a kid and becoming a young man. It's that youth apathy, that second-guessing yourself, not feeling like you fit in."

On file-sharing and lyric websites such as Limewire and Kazaa, "Creep" was often miscredited as "Half the Man I Used to Be" by Nirvana.

The version of the song that was released in the 1993 promotional single contains different vocal takes in the verses than on the album version, most notably with an alternate melody and added percussion in the second verse which is the arrangement most often performed live.

Music video
There were two videos shot for "Creep". The video that aired was directed by Graeme Joyce after a version by director Gus Van Sant was shelved due to its drug and sexual references.

Lyrical content
The song's lyrics were written by lead vocalist Scott Weiland and bassist Robert DeLeo. DeLeo also wrote the song's music. DeLeo stated the following about "Creep:"

Musically speaking I was thinking about a song along the lines of "Heart of Gold" by Neil Young, which is in the key of D-minor, the saddest key of all. Scott was thinking about the lyrics, and at that time in our lives we were struggling very much. What Scott was writing about was a real-life situation. Also about me, the thing about the gun. "Creep" is a very demeaning word. It was one of those instances where we looked at ourselves, looked in the mirror.

Track listing
 "Creep" [New Radio Version] - 4:31
 "Crackerman" - 3:12
 "Where the River Goes" - 8:20

German track listing
 Creep
 Dead and Bloated
 Piece of Pie

Charts

References

1990s ballads
1992 songs
1993 singles
Black-and-white music videos
Song recordings produced by Brendan O'Brien (record producer)
Songs written by Robert DeLeo
Songs written by Scott Weiland
Stone Temple Pilots songs
Alternative rock ballads
Atlantic Records singles